The Commodore A1060 Sidecar is an expansion hardware device developed by Commodore and released in 1986 for the Amiga 1000 computer. It features a complete PC XT-clone system mounted in an expansion case which connected to the expansion bus on the right side of the Amiga 1000 computer, sitting beside it similar to a motorcycle's sidecar, hence the name.

The PC side of the Sidecar was built around an Intel 8088 processor.  All I/O procedures from the PC side are performed by the Amiga.  Software was included to allow data to be exchanged easily between the PC and the Amiga side of the system. The Sidecar was available with an internal hard disk which was accessible from both the MS-DOS and AmigaOS environments. This was the first hard drive produced by Commodore for the Amiga.

Video display and user input were performed through the Amiga's monitor, keyboard, and mouse.  This allowed the user to control both computers simultaneously.

Characteristics 
The Amiga Sidecar was a complete IBM PC XT system, with the exception of I/O devices and operations (which are handled by the Amiga). Specifications include:

 Processor: Intel 8088 clocked at 4.77 MHz
 RAM: 256 kB (expandable to 512 kB + 80 kB Dual Bus Memory)
 Graphics Emulation: Dependent on Amiga settings. (can use real 8-bit ISA graphics cards)
 Sound Emulation: Dependent on Amiga settings. (can use real 8-bit ISA sound cards)
 One internal 5.25" drive bay (normally fitted with a 360K 5.25" floppy drive)
 3 x 8-bit ISA slots (for using real PC cards)
 Amiga 1000 Expansion Bus connector (for Amiga connectivity)
 Additional slot for an 8087 numeric coprocessor

History
Early in its life, the Amiga was strong in entertainment and graphics software but lacked general productivity software such as word processors, spreadsheets and database software. These are the areas where the de facto business standard IBM PC excelled. Commodore's intent was to let the Amiga take advantage of PC compatibility to shore up its weakness in this category of software.

Bruce F. Webster wrote in the October 1985 issue of BYTE, after seeing the Amiga for the first time:

Webster, in September 1986, noted the Sidecar's announcement as fulfilling his prediction. Jerry Pournelle that month named the Sidecar his "number one pick of Spring COMDEX, stating that "it was eerie to watch Flight Simulator running as if on a PC and still see the famous Amiga bouncing ball in the background and a word-processing program running in the foreground".

The Sidecar was developed by Commodore Germany, as was all of the Commodore PC-architecture based development. It was relatively expensive and it required a non-trivial amount of desktop space compared to the Amiga 1000 by itself. The device was also taller than the Amiga 1000, which made it seem even more aesthetically disconnected from the main system.

Besides the high price and the aesthetic issues, other factors contributed to the Sidecar's lack of adoption. The Amiga 2000 provided internal expansion slots, allowing the optional Bridgeboard card to replace the functionality of the Sidecar without needing a bulky external chassis. The popular Amiga 500 could not be used with the Sidecar at all, due to the expansion slot on the A500 residing on the left side of the chassis, as opposed to the right side on the A1000. Also, decent business and productivity software began to be released for AmigaOS, reducing the need to run MS-DOS applications on the Amiga.

This concept was continued in the later Amiga 2000 unit, containing four ISA slots intended for PC emulation expandability. Two slots were in-line with the Amiga Zorro II bus to allow installation of a Bridge board which, like the Sidecar, provided the core chipset of a PC on an expansion card, connected to both the Amiga and PC bus.

See also 
 MacCharlie

References

External links 
The big book of Amiga Hardware

Amiga
Compatibility cards
Computer-related introductions in 1986